Nicholas Herbert may refer to:
 Nicholas Herbert (politician, died 1775) (c. 1706–1775), British politician, member of parliament for Newport, and for Wilton
 Nicholas Herbert, 3rd Baron Hemingford, British peer and journalist
 Nick Herbert (born 1963), English politician, member of parliament for Arundel and South Downs
 Nick Herbert (physicist) (born 1936), American physicist